The Supreme Court Bar Association (SCBA) is a Nepali bar association, comprising the practising lawyers of the Supreme Court of Nepal. Khagendra Prasad Adhikari is the current president of the association and Shuvan Raj Acharya is the secretary.

Notable Persons 
Daman Nath Dhungana, Former Speaker 
Subash Chandra Nembang, former chairman of Constituent Assembly 
Hari Krishna Karki, Justice Supreme Court of Nepal

References

External links
 Official website

Organisations based in Nepal
Bar associations of Asia
Law of Nepal